Carlos Sáenz Herrera (Brussels, Belgium, 1 September 1910 – Saint José, 7 November 1980) was a Vice President of Costa Rica. He also served as a pioneer pediatrician in Costa Rica.

His parents were José Carlos Sáenz Esquivel and Úrsula Celina Herrera and Paut. He married his first wife in Carthage, Costa Rica, on 4 December 1937. Her name was María Virginia Pacheco Gutiérrez, daughter of José Joaquín Pacheco Cooper and Carlota Gutiérrez Urtecho. His second wife, married on 1 September 1958, was Ángela Carbonell Massenet. She was the daughter of Francisco of Take Carbonell I Reverter and Juana Bautista Massenet Pozo.

His primary studies were in the School Juan Rafael Dwells and secondary the Liceo of Costa Rica in Saint José where obtained his baccalaureate. When he finished his secondary studies he traveled to Belgium (1928), where graduated of doctor in Medicine in the Free University of Brussels (1934). Later he specialized in pediatrics in the University of Strasbourg, and returned to Costa Rica in 1935.

Professional activity 
He was an early pediatrician of Costa Rica. For many years he served as the Chairman of the Section of Pediatrics at the Hospital San Juan of God, and his efforts lead to the foundation of the National Children's Hospital, inaugurated in 1964, that today carries his name.

Public Office 
He served as minister of Health from 1949 to 1951 and vice-president of the Republic from 1962 to 1966. He served as interim President in 1963 and 1965, in replacement of the president Francisco José Orlich Bolmarcich.  Also he was a leader in Social Insurance, professor and dean of the Faculty of Medicine of the University of Costa Rica and president of the School of Doctors and Surgeons.

The Government of Belgium honored him in 1963 with the Order of the Crown.

Private activities 
He was an important criador of livestock of milk in his fincas The Jaúles, Bretaña and The Retreat, and obtained important prizes in exhibitions national and international agriculture people.

He was highly respected in his country, with a reputation of generosity and delivery to his patients.

Demise 
He died in San José, Costa Rica, on 7 November 1980. The Legislative Assembly of Costa Rica declared it benemérito of the Homeland in 1980.

His son Alberto Sáenz Pacheco is also an eminent doctor and has occupied a lead role in Social Insurance.

Footnotes

References 
Bonilla, H. H., The presidents, Saint José, National Printing, 1to. ed., 1979, vol. II, pp. 620–621.

See also 
 Vice-presidents of Costa Rica

1980 deaths
1910 births
Costa Rican pediatricians
Vice presidents of Costa Rica